Presidential elections were held in Armenia on 16 March 1998, with a second round on 30 March. The result was a victory for independent candidate Robert Kocharyan, who won 58.9% of the vote in the second round. Turnout was 63.5% in the first round and 68.1% in the second.

Overview
The first round was held on 16 March 1998. Prime Minister and acting President Robert Kocharyan and Karen Demirchyan, the leader of Soviet Armenia from 1974 to 1988, won the most votes: 38.5% and 30.5% respectively. Demirchyan, who came in second, had been absent from politics for 10 years and had been in business.

Demirchyan was seen as a good old man from the Soviet times who could "return to the certainties of the past and distaste for mafia capitalism personified by Ter-Petrosyan's rule." Demirchyan was very popular among the Armenian public. A poll quoted by Western diplomats, showed that Demirchyan had the support of the 53% of Armenians, while Kocharyan was favored by only 36%. He was also preferable for the West, since he had more moderate approach to the Karabakh conflict, while Kocharyan was seen as more likely to take a hard line because of his deep connections with Karabakh (Kocharyan is a native of the region and was previously president of the Nagorno-Karabakh Republic). Demirchyan was also favored by Russian leaders, who considered Kocharyan an obstacle to the resolution of the Karabakh conflict. Russia's foreign minister Yevgeny Primakov openly endorsed Demirchyan, while Kocharyan was depicted by Russian television as "pro-Western" and "a radical."

The second round of the election was held on March 30 between Kocharyan and Demirchyan. Kocharyan won with 58.9% of the vote. The final results showed Demirchyan having only 40.1% of the vote. The British Helsinki Human Rights Group claimed that "ordinary Armenians turned to Robert Kocharian as someone untainted by mafia connections and the intrigues of Yerevan politics." The OSCE observation mission described the first round as "deeply flawed," while their final report stated that the mission found "serious flaws" and that the election did not meet the OSCE standards. Although Demirchyan didn't officially dispute the election results, he never accepted them and did not congratulate Kocharyan.

Results

Analysis
Hrant Mikayelian, researcher at the Caucasus Institute, estimated, based on turnout analysts, that actual results of the first round were as follows: Kocharyan at 32.6%, Demirchyan at 33.5%, Manukyan at 13.3% and Badalyan at 12%. As for the final result, Mikayelian estimated that Kocharyan would still win if no electoral violations took place, but with a smaller margin: 50.6% vs Demirchyan's 48.3%.

References

External links
 Նախագահական ընտրություններ 1998 Internews Armenia
 1998-ի նախագահական ընտրությունները Internews Armenia

Armenia
Presidential elections in Armenia
1998 in Armenia
1990s in Armenian politics